Georgia Storm FC is an American soccer club based in Carrollton, Georgia, United States. The team competes in the Southeast Conference of the National Premier Soccer League (NPSL), the fourth tier of the United States soccer league system. The NPSL is officially affiliated to the United States Adult Soccer Association (USASA) and qualifies for the US Open Cup.

History

Inaugural Season

Georgia Storm FC played their inaugural match on May 1, 2021, against Georgia Revolution, resulting in a 1–0 loss at home in Carrollton. Georgia Storm achieved its first goals and victory in the National Premier Soccer League (NPSL) on May 15 against LSA Athletico Lanier. The first goal was an own goal and the second was a header off a set piece late in the second half by Stephen Bivens assisted by Andrew Carleton. Including the win against LSA Lanier, the Storm went on a five-game unbeaten streak. Their first road loss was at North Alabama SC on June 12. This match was followed by a win on June 19 against the same North Alabama side. On June 26, Georgia Storm scored 14 goals in a Fabian Pekruhl clean sheet against Metro Louisville, which included six goals by Stephen Bivens, four by Wilfried Kamdem Tchoupa, two by Avery Shepard, and once each by Jeisson Palencia and Jacob Bivens. Georgia Storm ended conference play against Appalachian FC in Boone, NC, falling at the end 3–2 in front of 1,100 in attendance. The team finished in second place in the conference and thus made the playoffs. The first playoff match was played in Carrollton against Appalachian FC, resulting in a 2–1 victory with goals from Andrew Carleton and Wilfried Kamden Tchoupa.  In the conference championship against Georgia Revolution FC, a 2–1 loss ended the inaugural season. Due to the team's success, a spot in the qualifying rounds of the US Open Cup was obtained.

The 2021 roster included three former MLS players, including Hunter Jumper, Kevin Barajas, and Andrew Carleton.

Fabian Pekruhl, Stephen Bivens, and Wilfried Kamdem Tchoupa were named to the 2021 NPSL Southeast Conference Best XI.

Georgia Storm FC played in their first ever US Open Cup match on October 16 against Georgia Revolution at Luella High School. The match was tied until the second half, when Revolution's Christian Duncan converted his first. Deep into stoppage time, Gerard Forges scored from close range, assisted by Stephen Bivens to send the match to added time. The Storm struck early in added time with Jacob Bivens netting a header before a last effort strike by Duncan sent the game to penalty kicks. Georgia Revolution converted all their kicks and won the match 2–2 (4–2).

2022 Season

Pre-season
The Storm opened its account in 2022 with a pre-season friendly with Atlanta United on Tuesday, January 25 at 11AM in a closed-door friendly at Children's Healthcare of Atlanta Training Ground. It was the first preseason match of the year for both clubs. After three minutes, Atlanta United attacker Luiz Araujo beat several players to create space for Erik Centeno who cut back and shot towards goal when Fabian Pekruhl made the save, but Tyler Wolff finished to give Atlanta United a 1–0 advantage. At the fifteen-minute mark, Storm delivered a corner from the right-hand side that was cleared up the line by Tyler Wolff to Luiz Araujo who drove forward towards Storm's defense before sliding a pass through to Jackson Conway who finished it off to put Atlanta United ahead 2–0 at halftime. In the second half, Storm played into the match, creating a few half-chances. With minutes left to play, Andrew Carleton drove into the left edge of the box where he cut back and had his shot towards the goal blocked by a sliding defender. As a highlight on the day, Storm's Youth Academy player, Isaac Cruz, made his first team debut in the final moments. On the day, Storm had 4 current Youth Academy players from its U16 National League PRO team earning their first experience with Storm's First Team. Joining Isaac were Nyckolas Waits, Wyatt Mathis-Kline and Jon Smith.

Regular Season

The Storm took a step back in 2022 recording a record of 2-7-1 with wins vs. LSA Lanier and Apotheos FC.

Stadium 

 University of West Georgia Soccer Field; Carrollton, GA (2021-current)

Georgia Storm FC played their 2021 inaugural season at Carrollton High School's Grisham Stadium before moving to the West Georgia soccer field for 2022.

Training Ground 

 Alexander High School (2022)
 New Manchester High School (2021)

Colors and Badge

In December 2020, on the heels of the launch of the team in the National Premier Soccer League in the Southeast Conference, the club launched a search for a new logo that would represent the club and its community as it moved into the semi-professional ranks. The color scheme was black, gold, white, and a light blue to represent the club. They announced the new logo on December 22, 2021. For the community, it represents playing in the state of Georgia, as well as its primary three cities of Carrollton, Douglasville, and Villa Rica being represented by the three gold stars. The antlers represent the White Tail Deer, which is official state animal. The Storm wordmark represents the values of Storm in power, passion, and unrelenting strength. Lastly, the symbol is a show of strength as they can weather any storm.

Kits

For its first season, Georgia Storm adopted the Puma Cup Jersey for its first team and U23s.

Kit Sponsors

On April 8, 2021, the team announced Scott Evans Auto Group as its primary jersey sponsor for the first team. The terms and length of the contract were not disclosed. Later in April, the team announced RedMed Urgent Clinic and GreyStone Power Corporation as sponsors for the back of the kit below the number. Soon after in May, Hacienda San Antonio Mexican Taqueria was announced as the primary training jersey sponsor for the team.

Rivalries

In its first year, the Storm formed a strong rivalry with Georgia Revolution from their inaugural match. In the first year of the rivalry, the teams faced off three times, including in the Southeast Conference Championship game. It's a fierce battle between two top competitors in the National Premier Soccer League.

Players and staff

Current roster
As of March 3, 2023

Notable Former Players

Academy Graduates

Technical staff

Records

Seasons

NPSL

Goals

Cleansheets

Honors

Domestic trophies 
 National Premier Soccer League Southeast Conference
 Runners-Up  : 2021

Club culture

Supporters 

The supporter group of Georgia Storm FC is The Storm Chasers. The group is the core of the home fans, travels to away games, and promotes the team to the community.

Affiliates 

 Villa Rica Soccer Association, Villa Rica, Georgia
 Darlington Soccer Academy, Rome, Georgia
 MAYSA Storm, Madison, Georgia
 Lake Country United FC, Eatonton, Georgia

Development System

U23 Team
Georgia Storm fields a U23 team in the UPSL to bridge our Youth Academy to our First team, which competes in the Southeast Conference Georgia Div. I.

The Georgia Storm Soccer Academy provides recreation, academy, and select programs for almost 2,000 youth players, mostly in the Carroll County and Douglas County areas of western Georgia. Storm teams participate in the USYS National League, Club Champions League, Georgia Premier League, and are affiliated with Georgia Soccer.

U23 Stadium 

 New Manchester High School Stadium, Douglasville, Georgia

UPSL Records

Georgia Storm U23

Youth Academy

Georgia Storm FC youth academy teams participate in United States Youth Soccer Association under United States Soccer Federation where they have teams from recreational (3 to 19 year olds) to Youth Academy (9 to 19 year olds) to Amateur for the adults in the community. In its Youth Academy, they have teams that participate in USYS National League in the Piedmont Conference where they have won 3 consecutive titles in the 2006 boys division. At the state level, they have won 3 Georgia Soccer State Cups as well as 1 finalist medal. On the girls side, the 2004 girls won the 2021 title, and on the boys, the 2006 boys won the 2021 and 2020 title. The 2006 boys team was semi-finalist at the 2021 Region III Southern Championships in Greenville, South Carolina at the MESA Soccer Complex. For the 2022 Southern Regional Championships, their youth academy has both the 2006 boys and 2004 girls qualified for the event in June.  The 2006 boys also compete in the USYS National League PRO league where the top 64 teams in the country compete.

Youth Training Grounds 

 East Carroll Park, Carrollton, Georgia 
 Chestnut Log, Douglasville, Georgia
 Boundary Waters, Douglasville, Georgia
 Fowler Park, Douglasville, Georgia
 Fullerville Park, Villa Rica, Georgia
 Alexander High School, Douglasville, Georgia
 Carrollton High School Indoor Facility, Carrollton, Georgia

Broadcasting

Georgia Storm FC uses Eleven Sports to broadcast all of its home matches.

References

External links
 
 Georgia Storm Soccer Academy

National Premier Soccer League teams
Association football clubs established in 2020
2020 establishments in Georgia (U.S. state)
Soccer clubs in Georgia (U.S. state)